The 1943 National Football League Draft was held on April 8, 1943, at the Palmer House Hotel in Chicago, Illinois. With the first overall pick of the draft, the Detroit Lions selected running back Frank Sinkwich. This draft is the first NFL draft not to produce a member of the Pro Football Hall of Fame.

Player selections

Round one

Round two

Round three

Round four

Round five

Round six

Round seven

Round eight

Round nine

Round ten

Round eleven

Round twelve

Round thirteen

Round fourteen

Round fifteen

Round sixteen

Round seventeen

Round eighteen

Round nineteen

Round twenty

Round twenty-one

Round twenty-two

Round twenty-three

Round twenty-four

Round twenty-five

Round twenty-six

Round twenty-seven

Round twenty-eight

Round twenty-nine

Round thirty

Round thirty-one

Round thirty-two

Hall of Famers
None of the players selected in the 1943 NFL draft have been inducted into the Pro Football Hall of Fame.

Notable undrafted players

References

External links
 NFL.com – 1943 Draft
 databaseFootball.com – 1943 Draft
 Pro Football Hall of Fame

National Football League Draft
Draft
NFL Draft
NFL Draft
1940s in Chicago
American football in Chicago
Events in Chicago